A healer is a type of character class in video gaming.  When a game includes a health game mechanic and multiple classes, often one of the classes will be designed around the restoration of allies' health, known as healing, in order to delay or prevent their defeat.  Such a class can be referred to as a healer.  In addition to healing, healer classes are sometimes associated with buffs to assist allies in other ways, and nukes to contribute to the offense when healing is unnecessary.

A description of Healers from the NetHack Guidebook is as follows:

When both healer and tank classes exist, a common grouping strategy is for the healer to focus healing on an allied tank, while the tank prevents other allies, including the healer, from losing health.

Healers are often represented as a fantasy spell-caster (such as a cleric, druid or shaman), a realistic combat specialist (such as a medic or paladin), a science-fiction technician (such as a repairman or engineer), or the like.

History

Abilities
A healer is generally tasked with restoring health, removing poison-like effects, and reviving fallen party members. Different games may include different mechanics, such as the ability to deal damage or to enhance the attributes of their allies.

Roles
If the tank's job is to take damage, the healer's job is to heal it. In small groups, they may also be tasked to heal the group as well, but in large scale group-play there are typically specific healers assigned to party-wide damage (typically taken indirectly, via lesser minions, spells or environment/habitat of the boss).

Specifications

Targeting specifics
Healers fall into two major categories when it comes to targeting options: Single-Target and Multi-Target.

Single-Target healers often have much more potent spells than their Multi-Targeting counterparts, such as those that fully restore a target's Health or resurrect an ally that had previously lost all their Health.

Multi-Target healers tend to lack potency, but heal multiple allies (often the entire Party) with abilities. In Tactical RPGs or open-world games, their spells may utilize an AoE or Area of Effect mechanic. Healers that fall into this sub-type often do not possess resurrection spells.

Healers often do not utilise only one targeting system. Targeting options tend to depend on the skill rather than the character.

Sub-jobs
Healers have a small number of roles that they can be delegated towards. Often, a healer will fill one or more of these roles. Alternatively, a healer may fill one of these roles in addition to some other job, such as damage dealing (Battle Cleric, Druid), inflicting negative statuses on enemies (Witch/Warlock), or even drawing in damage (Paladin).

 Restoration: Restoring Health to allies. This tends to be the job most associated with healer classes.
 Curation: Removing harmful or otherwise negative statuses from allies.
 Support: Used in the context of healers, this typically refers to applying regenerative buffs or shields to allies.
 Resurrection: The rarest healer archetype, focused on not preventing death, but overcoming it.
 Necromancers are a blurry line against the grain of Resurrection healers. They're often more classified as a summoner, summoning skeleton or zombie themed minions to deal damage or draw enemy attacks.

See also
 DPS, the average rate of damage inflicted over time within video games.
 Spell-caster (gaming), a common character class focused on dealing damage, while being relatively weak.
 Tank (gaming), a common character class focused on drawing enemy damage.

References

Video games about magic
Character classes
Esports terminology